The Papuan treecreeper (Cormobates placens) is a species of bird in the family Climacteridae. It was previously considered a subspecies of the white-throated treecreeper (C. leucophaea).
 
It is found in the highlands of New Guinea.

References

Papuan treecreeper
Birds of New Guinea
Papuan treecreeper
Papuan treecreeper
Taxonomy articles created by Polbot